Lipocalin-2 (LCN2), also known as oncogene 24p3 or neutrophil gelatinase-associated lipocalin (NGAL), is a protein that in humans is encoded by the LCN2 gene. NGAL is involved in innate immunity by sequestering iron and preventing its use by bacteria, thus limiting their growth. It is expressed in neutrophils and in low levels in the kidney, prostate, and epithelia of the respiratory and alimentary tracts. NGAL is used as a biomarker of kidney injury.

Function 

The binding of NGAL to bacterial siderophores is important in the innate immune response to bacterial infection. Upon encountering invading bacteria, the toll-like receptors on immune cells stimulate the synthesis and secretion of NGAL. Secreted NGAL then limits bacterial growth by sequestering iron-containing siderophores. Lipocalin-2 binds, next to bacterial siderophores, also to the mammalian siderophore 2,5-dihydroxybenzoic acid (2,5-DHBA). This complex ensures that excess free iron does not accumulate in the cytoplasm. Mammalian cells lacking 2,5-DHBA accumulate abnormal intracellular levels of iron leading to high levels of reactive oxygen species. Lipocalin-2 also functions as a growth factor and participates in synaptic plasticity.

Clinical significance 

In the case of acute kidney injury  (AKI), NGAL is secreted in high levels into the blood and urine within 2 hours of injury. Because NGAL is protease resistant and small, the protein is easily excreted and detected in the urine.  NGAL levels in patients with AKI have been associated with the severity of their prognosis and can be used as a biomarker for AKI NGAL can also be used as an early diagnosis for procedures such as chronic kidney disease, contrast induced nephropathy, and kidney transplant.

Kidney health is most frequently measured by serum creatinine. Serum creatinine is a marker of kidney function, whereas NGAL is a marker of kidney injury. NGAL levels are a more precise and sensitive marker for diagnosing AKI than serum creatinine levels. Therefore, monitoring NGAL levels reduces delayed AKI diagnosis and treatment. Using a more sensitive and specific marker allows for earlier diagnosis, correct responses to AKI, and reduced risk of morbidity and mortality.

The NGAL level measured in an individual is proportional to the severity of the AKI. Individuals positive for NGAL tend to have higher incidence of renal replacement therapy and have higher rates of in-hospital mortality, both in the presence and the absence of serum creatinine. Therefore, an individual may have AKI without the presence of serum creatinine.

The ability to diagnose AKI before acute kidney failure is financially beneficial and favorable for preventative health measures. More than 10% of people in the United States will develop some kind of chronic kidney disease (CKD), with higher incidences for individuals that suffer from obesity, elevated cholesterol, and a family history of CKD. There is no point of return once there is a significant injury to the kidney; therefore, early diagnosis of kidney injury is important for preventing AKI. Using NGAL as a biomarker can lower hospital costs because fewer patients will reach a critical stage in kidney injury. Ultimately, diagnosis of AKI with NGAL can reduce the time a patient stays in a hospital. For example, the early diagnosis of AKI with NGAL as a biomarker can help a patient avoid kidney dialysis.

Laboratory measurement 

Renal expression of NGAL increases in the kidneys after injury for a variety of reasons. The level of NGAL in the urine and plasma increases within 2 hours of kidney injury. It is possible to measure NGAL in serum or urine in the range of 25 to 5,000 ng/mL by current laboratory tests. Low levels for NGAL have been considered to be 20 ng/mL, medium levels 200 ng/mL, and high levels 1200 ng/mL.

A study on children with pediatric cardiopulmonary bypass operations showed that urinary NGAL concentrations above 50 ng/mL 2 hours after surgery is indicative of serum creatinine levels 50% over basal values. Normally, children tend to have almost undetectable levels of NGAL. Therefore, studies that include children are considered to be “pure.” Adult patients presenting for cardiopulmonary bypass surgery are not considered to be “pure” in NGAL studies because adults often have other disorders such as inflammatory conditions, which can cause slight increases in NGAL.

AKI studies investigating the use of NGAL as a biomarker often compare serum creatinine and NGAL production. Unfortunately, serum creatinine production is variable and can reflect hemodynamic variation in the glomerular filtration rate formerly known as prerenal azotemia; therefore, the comparison is not always reliable because creatinine and NGAL measure different components of renal (dys)function. The demonstration that NGAL does not rise in the setting of transient changes in creatinine can help clinicians determine whether changes in creatinine reflect kidney damage or rather only non specific or mild functional changes in kidney function.

Lipocalin-2 (NGAL) is typically assessed for clinical or research purposes using ELISA or immunoturbidimetric assays.

References 

Lipocalins